Sharon Mills (born 11 February 1970), is a female former judoka who competed for England.

Judo career
Mills represented England and won a gold medal in the 66 kg middleweight category, at the 1990 Commonwealth Games in Auckland, New Zealand. In 1991, she became champion of Great Britain, winning the middleweight division at the British Judo Championships.

References

1970 births
English female judoka
Commonwealth Games medallists in judo
Commonwealth Games gold medallists for England
Judoka at the 1990 Commonwealth Games
Living people
Medallists at the 1990 Commonwealth Games